Naval and Maritime Academy (NMA), Trincomalee, is the naval academy of the Sri Lanka Navy, and is located within SLN Dockyard, Trincomalee. It received university status in 2001 under the leadership of Commodore SR Samaratunga.

History
The Sri Lanka Naval and Maritime Academy was established on 15 January 1967, and was subsequently commissioned on 15 July 1967 with Instructor Commander M. G. S. Perera as the first Commandant. NMA hold the ISO 9001:2000 Quality Management System Certification awarded by the Sri Lanka Standards Institution in 2007. This was upgraded to ISO 9001:2008 in 2010. In recognition of its service rendered over the years, the NMA was awarded with the prestigious President's Colours in 2003.

Training courses
There are several intakes for cadet officers and midshipmen annually. These are under the following category:

Officer mid-career courses
 Long Logistics Management Course (LLMC) - Accredited to the General Sir John Kotelawala Defence University for the Master of Business Administration in Logistics Management.
 Junior Naval Staff Course (JNSC) - Accredited to the General Sir John Kotelawala Defence University for the Post Graduate Diploma in Defence Management.
 Service Entry Technical Course (for Engineering, Electrical Engineering, Hull Engineering, Civil Engineering, Administration Officer Health, Information Technology and Band Master Branches) - Accredited to the University of Kelaniya for a Post Graduate Diploma.

Officer entry courses
 Sub Lieutenant Technical Course
Executive branch - Accredited to the University of Kelaniya for the Bachelor of Science in Naval and Maritime Studies.
Logistics branch - Accredited to the University of Kelaniya for the Bachelor of Science in Logistic Management
Naval Patrolman Branch/Provost Branch - Accredited to the University of Kelaniya for the Bachelor of Science in Naval Studies
 Direct Entry Course (for professional for other branches)
 General Sir John Kotelawala Defence University (KDU) Entry Course 
 Service Entry Course (for serving ratings)

Other courses
 Long Gunnery Course
 Long Navigation Course
 Long Communication Course
 Long Anti-Submarine Warfare Course

See also
SLN Dockyard
SLNS Gajabahu
General Sir John Kotelawala Defence University
Sri Lanka Military Academy
Air Force Academy, China Bay

References

External links
 
 

Sri Lanka Navy
Military academies of Sri Lanka
Staff colleges in Sri Lanka
Military education and training in Sri Lanka
Naval academies
Maritime colleges
Educational institutions established in 1967
Installations of the Sri Lanka Navy
Buildings and structures in Trincomalee
SLN Dockyard
Education in Eastern Province, Sri Lanka
Colleges affiliated to General Sir John Kotelawala Defence University